Ronald Stuart Thomas (29 March 1913 – 25 September 2000), published as R. S. Thomas, was a Welsh poet and Anglican priest (Church of Wales) noted for nationalism, spirituality and dislike of the anglicisation of Wales. John Betjeman, introducing Song at the Year's Turning (1955), the first collection of Thomas's poetry from a major publisher, predicted that Thomas would be remembered long after he himself was forgotten. M. Wynn Thomas said: "He was the Aleksandr Solzhenitsyn of Wales because he was such a troubler of the Welsh conscience. He was one of the major English language and European poets of the 20th century."

Life
R. S. Thomas was born in Cardiff as the only child of Margaret (née Davies) and Thomas Hubert Thomas. The family moved to Holyhead in 1918 because of his father's work in the Merchant Navy. He was awarded a bursary in 1932 to study at the University College of North Wales, where he read Latin. In 1936, after he completed his theological training at St Michael's College, Llandaff, he was ordained as a priest in the Anglican Church in Wales. From 1936 to 1940 he was the curate of Chirk, Denbighshire, where he met his future wife, Mildred "Elsi" Eldridge, an English artist. He subsequently became curate-in charge of Tallarn Green, Flintshire, as part of his duties as curate of Hanmer.

In Hanmer he was an assistant to the Rev. Thomas Meredith-Morris, grandfather of the writer Lorna Sage, a fact later described by Byron Rogers as a "crossing of paths of two of Wales's strangest clergymen". Whilst Sage devotes a great deal of her autobiography Bad Blood to her late relative, she does not mention Thomas, who was in any case in Hanmer before Sage was born. However, her memoir gives some insight into the strange environment in which Thomas worked as a young priest. Thomas never wrote much about his curacies and nothing is known of the relationship between him and Meredith-Morris.

Thomas and Eldridge were married in 1940 and remained together until her death in 1991. Their son, (Andreas) Gwydion, was born on 29 August 1945 and died on 15 September 2016. Gwydion often spoke about his difficult upbringing with a family living in near poverty, while he was sent to a number of traumatic boarding schools. The Thomas family lived on a tiny income and lacked the comforts of modern life, largely through their own choice. One of the few household amenities the family ever owned, a vacuum cleaner, was rejected because Thomas decided it was too noisy.

From 1942 to 1954 Thomas was rector of St Michael's Church, Manafon, near Welshpool in rural Montgomeryshire. During his time there he began to study Welsh and published his first three volumes of poetry, The Stones of the Field (1946), An Acre of Land (1952) and The Minister (1953). Thomas's poetry achieved a breakthrough with the publication in 1955 of his fourth book, Song at the Year's Turning, in effect a collected edition of his first three volumes. This was critically well received and opened with an introduction by Betjeman. His position was also helped by winning the Royal Society of Literature's Heinemann Award.

Thomas learnt the Welsh language from the age of 30, – too late in life, he said, to be able to write poetry in it. The 1960s saw him working in a predominantly Welsh-speaking community and he later wrote two prose works in Welsh, Neb (Nobody), an ironic and revealing autobiography written in the third person, and Blwyddyn yn Llŷn (A Year in Llŷn). In 1964 he won the Queen's Gold Medal for Poetry. From 1967 to 1978 he was vicar of St Hywyn's Church (built 1137) in Aberdaron at the western tip of the Llŷn Peninsula.

Thomas retired as a clergyman in 1978. He and his wife moved to Y Rhiw, into "a tiny, unheated cottage in one of the most beautiful parts of Wales, where, however, the temperature sometimes dipped below freezing," according to Theodore Dalrymple. Free from church constraints, he was able to become more political and active in campaigns that were important to him. He became a fierce advocate of Welsh nationalism, although he never supported Plaid Cymru, as it recognised the Westminster Parliament and so in his view fell short in its opposition to England.

Thomas was nominated for the 1996 Nobel Prize in Literature, the winner of which was Wislawa Szymborska. He received the 1996 Lannan Literary Award for Lifetime Achievement.

Thomas died on 25 September 2000 aged 87, at his home in Pentrefelin near Criccieth, survived by his second wife, Elizabeth Vernon. He had been ill with a heart condition and treated at Ysbyty Gwynedd in Bangor until two weeks before he died. A memorial event celebrating his life and poetry was held at Westminster Abbey with readings from Heaney, Andrew Motion, Gillian Clarke and John Burnside. Thomas's ashes are buried near the door of St John's Church, Porthmadog, Gwynedd.

Beliefs and contribution to spirituality

Religious views
Thomas's son, Gwydion, a resident of Thailand, recalls his father's sermons, in which he would "drone on" to absurd lengths about the evil of refrigerators, washing machines, televisions and other modern devices. Thomas preached that they were all part of the temptation of scrambling after gadgets rather than attending to more spiritual needs. "It was the Machine, you see," Gwydion explained to a biographer. "This to a congregation that didn't have any of these things and were longing for them." Although he may have taken some ideas to extreme lengths, Theodore Dalrymple wrote, Thomas "was raising a deep and unanswered question: What is life for? Is it simply to consume more and more, and divert ourselves with ever more elaborate entertainments and gadgetry? What will this do to our souls?" He had a reputation, which perhaps he cultivated, of being not always charitable and sometimes awkward and taciturn. Some critics have interpreted photographs of him as indicating he was "formidable, bad-tempered, and apparently humourless."

In terms of religion, although he sometimes appeared to lack charity and patience, Thomas served as a Church in Wales parish priest all his working life. His training at St Michael's College, Llandaff, placed him somewhat in the Tractarian Tradition, though he does not seem to have been more than central in his position as regards the conduct of services. Although a fervent Welsh nationalist, he appears to have preferred the 1662 Book of Common Prayer of the Church of England (even in Welsh translation) over the 1966 order for the Holy Eucharist which the Church in Wales produced for itself and which came into use during his final year at Eglwys Fach. In one of his autobiographical books, he asserted that in retirement he could no longer bring himself to go to Holy Communion on account of the changes, although one of his successors at Aberdaron indicated that Thomas always retained the bishop's permission to officiate and occasionally did so at Llanfaelrhys, when no one else could be found. His prime objection to the revised services was that since the Second Vatican Council (1962–65) – which also had liturgical repercussions within Anglicanism – he could not bear to see the priest facing the people when in reality he should be leading the people towards God from the traditional east-facing position. "It is to God that the mystery belongs," he wrote pointedly, "and woe to man when he interferes with that mystery. As T. S. Eliot says: 'Humankind cannot bear very much reality.'"

Thomas seems early on to have become interested in Theosophy (an interest he did not pursue beyond some interfaith study) and over time he appears to have had some sympathy with the theological explorations of the one-time Bishop of Woolwich John A. T. Robinson in his 1963 Honest to God, on one occasion going as far as to describe the Resurrection of Christ as a "metaphor". In a letter to a theological student in 1993 he denied he held similar views to the non-realist Cambridge theologian and philosopher Don Cupitt. "I believe in revelation," Thomas wrote, "and therefore one cannot describe all one's insights as entirely human." Above all, his main influence appears to have been the philosopher Kierkegaard – and his "leap of faith" – although he also appears to have concerned himself with the limitations of religious language in an era becoming progressively more post-Christian in the face of science and philosophy. Yet for all his explorations, his sermons and practice as a priest do not seem to have been heterodox, even if in retirement he was to write to his long-term friend, the poet Raymond Garlick, to give him "the address of a retired Christian".

As a priest, it seems that Thomas did not believe he was there to promote his own views, but those of the church he served, and for all his vaunted crabbiness, he seems to have been well enough regarded by parishioners, though biographies offer notable exceptions. He has been credited by some as a capable listener and counsellor at a time when such things were not common among the clergy, and to have been a devoted visitor to the sick. However, his tendency to remoteness led one of his successors to say that she had, as parish priest of Aberdaron, to "do a lot of healing". Nonetheless, his influence as a poet had a considerable impact on spirituality, to the extent that on the centenary of his birth, Archbishop of Wales, Barry Morgan, who had known the poet personally, paid tribute to him:
R. S. Thomas continues to articulate through his poetry questions that are inscribed on the heart of most Christian pilgrims in their search for meaning and truth. We search for God and feel Him near at hand, only then to blink and find Him gone. This poetry persuades us that we are not alone in this experience of faith – the poet has been there before us.

Views on Welsh politics
Thomas believed in what he called "the true Wales of my imagination", a Welsh-speaking aboriginal community in tune with the natural world. He viewed western (specifically English) materialism and greed, represented in the poetry by his mythical "Machine", as the destroyers of community. He could tolerate neither the English who bought up Wales and in his view stripped it of its wild and essential nature, nor the Welsh whom he saw as all too eager to kowtow to English money and influence.

Thomas was an ardent supporter of the Campaign for Nuclear Disarmament (CND) and described himself as a pacifist, but also supported the nationalist Meibion Glyndŵr fire bombings of English-owned holiday cottages in rural Wales. On this subject he said in 1998, "What is one death against the death of the whole Welsh nation?" He was also active in wildlife preservation and worked with the RSPB and Welsh volunteer organisations for the preservation of the red kite. He resigned his RSPB membership over their plans to introduce non-native kites to Wales.

Thomas was a supporter of Welsh independence.

Works

Almost all of Thomas's work concerns the Welsh landscape and the Welsh people, themes with both political and spiritual subtext. His views on the position of the Welsh people, as a conquered people are never far below the surface. As a cleric, his religious views are also present in his works. His earlier works focus on the personal stories of his parishioners, the farm labourers and working men and their wives, challenging the cosy view of the traditional pastoral poem with harsh and vivid descriptions of rural lives. The beauty of the landscape, although ever-present, is never suggested as a compensation for the low pay or monotonous conditions of farm work. This direct view of "country life" comes as a challenge to many English writers writing on similar subjects and challenging the more pastoral works of contemporary poets such as Dylan Thomas.

Thomas's later works were of a more metaphysical nature, more experimental in their style and focusing more overtly on his spirituality. Laboratories of the Spirit (1975) gives, in its title, a hint at this development and also reveals Thomas's increasing experiments with scientific metaphor. He described this shift as an investigation into the "adult geometry of the mind". Fearing that poetry was becoming a dying art, inaccessible to those who most needed it, "he attempted to make spiritually minded poems relevant within, and relevant to, a science-minded, post-industrial world," to represent that world both in form and in content even as he rejected its machinations.

Despite his nationalism Thomas could be hard on his fellow countrymen. Often his works read more as a criticism of Welshness than a celebration. He said there is a "lack of love for human beings" in his poetry. Other critics have been less harsh. Al Alvarez said, "He was wonderful, very pure, very bitter, but the bitterness was beautifully and very sparely rendered. He was completely authoritative, a very, very fine poet, completely off on his own, out of the loop but a real individual. It's not about being a major or minor poet. It's about getting a work absolutely right by your own standards and he did that wonderfully well."

Thomas's final works commonly sold 20,000 copies in Britain alone.

Books

The Stones of the Field (1946) Druid Press, Carmarthen
An Acre of Land (1952) Montgomeryshire Printing Co, Newtown
The Minister (1953) Montgomeryshire Printing Co, Newtown
Song at the Year's Turning (1955) Rupert Hart-Davis, London
Poetry for Supper (1958) Rupert Hart-Davis, London
 Judgement Day, Poetry Book Society, 1960
Tares, [Corn-weed] (1961) Rupert Hart-Davis, London
The Bread of Truth (1963) Rupert Hart-Davis, London
Words and the Poet (1964, lecture) University of Wales Press, Cardiff
Pietà (1966) Rupert Hart-Davis, London
 The Mountains (1968) illustrations by John Piper, Chilmark Press
 Postcard: Song (1968) Fishpaste Postcard Series
Not That He Brought Flowers (1968) Rupert Hart-Davis, London
H'm (1972) Macmillan, London
Selected Poems, 1946–1968, Hart-Davis MacGibbon, 1973 and St. Martin's Press, New York, 1974; Bloodaxe Books, Newcastle upon Tyne, 1986
What is a Welshman? (1974) Christopher Davies Publishers, Swansea
Laboratories of the Spirit (1975) Macmillan, London
Abercuawg (1976, lecture) Cyngor Celfyddydau Cymru
The Way of It (1977) Ceolfrith Press, Sunderland,
Frequencies (1978) Macmillan, London
Between Here and Now (1981) Macmillan, London
Later Poems, 1972–1982 (1983) Macmillan (London)
A Selection of Poetry (1983) edited by D. J. Hignett, Hignett School Services
 Poets' Meeting (1983) Celandine
Ingrowing Thoughts (1985) Poetry Wales Press, Bridgend
Neb (1985) (Welsh, third person autobiography), Gwasg Gwynedd, Caernarfon
Destinations (1985) Celandine
Poems of R. S. Thomas (1985) University of Arkansas Press
Experimenting with an Amen (1986) Macmillan, London
Welsh Airs (1987) Seren, Bridgend
The Echoes Return Slow (1988) Macmillan, London
Counterpoint (1990) Bloodaxe Books, Newcastle upon Tyne
Blwyddyn yn Llŷn (1990) (in Welsh)
Pe Medrwn Yr Iaith : ac ysgrifau eraill ed. Tony Brown & Bedwyr L. Jones, (1990) (essays, in Welsh) Christopher Davies Publishers, Swansea
Cymru or Wales? (1992) Gomer Press
Mass for Hard Times (1992) Bloodaxe Books, Newcastle upon Tyne
Collected Poems, 1945–1990 (1993) Dent
No Truce with the Furies (1995) Bloodaxe Books, Newcastle upon Tyne
Autobiographies (1997, translations from Welsh) trans. Jason Walford Davies Phoenix Books, London
Residues (2002, posthumously) Bloodaxe Books, Tarset
Collected Later Poems 1988–2000 (2004, posthumously) Bloodaxe Books, Tarset
Uncollected Poems ed. Tony Brown & Jason Walford Davies (2013, posthumously) Bloodaxe Books, Tarset
Too Brave to Dream: Encounters with Modern Art ed. Tony Brown & Jason Walford Davies (2016, posthumously) Bloodaxe Books, Hexham

References

Sources

Further reading

External links

Profile at Poetry Archive
Profile at Poetry Foundation
Guardian obituary. 27 September 2000
"The Country Clergy": a poem by R. S. Thomas from TLS, 26 February 2008.
"R.S. Thomas's Existential Agony" by John Pikoulis and Martin Roberts at poetrymagazines.org.uk
R. S. Thomas Study Centre

1913 births
2000 deaths
Alumni of Bangor University
Writers from Cardiff
Anglo-Welsh poets
Welsh-language writers
20th-century Welsh Anglican priests
Anglican pacifists
Welsh nationalists
Alumni of St Michael's College, Llandaff
Burials in Wales
People from Chirk
People from Holyhead
20th-century Welsh poets
Articles containing video clips
Welsh-speaking writers
Anglican_poets
Poet priests